The Jabez Weston House is a historic house in Reading, Massachusetts.  The older portion of this -story timber-frame house was built c. 1779 in a late-Georgian early-Federalist style.  This portion consisted of a five bay section with a centrally located front door.  Sometime (probably still in the 18th century), an eastern extension added three bays and a second entrance, converting the building into a two family residence.  The property belonged to the Weston family, who were early settlers of the area.

The house was listed on the National Register of Historic Places in 1984.

See also
National Register of Historic Places listings in Reading, Massachusetts
National Register of Historic Places listings in Middlesex County, Massachusetts

References

Houses on the National Register of Historic Places in Reading, Massachusetts
Houses in Reading, Massachusetts
1779 establishments in Massachusetts
Federal architecture in Massachusetts
Georgian architecture in Massachusetts